The 2015–16 Djibouti Premier League was the 28th season of the Djibouti Premier League. The defending champions of the league are AS Ali Sabieh Djibouti Télécom.

Teams

Season

League table

Results

References

External links
 Website of the Federation – Standings & results
 RSSSF competition history

Football leagues in Djibouti
Premier League
Premier League
Djibouti